Ademar da Silva Braga is a Brazilian football manager who has managed Chinese side Changsha Ginde, the Iran national football team, Brazilian Série A club Corinthians and America FC.

Career
After gaining a degree in Physical Education he would move into assistant coaching and physical training where he initially gained his first job as an assistant with CR Vasco da Gama in 1983. He would broaden his horizons with a move to Asia where he gained experience in Kuwait and Japanese side Cerezo Osaka upon returning to Brazil.

In 1999 Ademar took his first permanent Head coach position with top tier Chinese side Shenyang Haishi where he guided them to eleventh within the league. This was soon followed by a move to the Iran national football team where despite winning all three of the games he was in charge of he was soon replaced for a more high-profile manager in Miroslav Blažević.

Ademar would return to Brazil where he continued to be an assistant before joining Brazilian Série A side Corinthians as an assistant coach in 2005. On March 14, 2006 he became their care-taker coach where he replaced Antônio Lopes before he was appointed as manager. By May 10, 2006 he was replaced by Geninho and Ademar soon returned to assistant coaching with Mirassol Futebol Clube.

Honours
America FC
Campeonato Carioca - Série B: 2009

References

External links
Profile at Soccerway.com

Sportspeople from Rio de Janeiro (city)
Brazilian football managers
Brazilian expatriate football managers
Expatriate football managers in Iran
Living people
Sport Club Corinthians Paulista managers
Expatriate football managers in China
Guangzhou City F.C. managers
Iran national football team managers
1945 births